Paežeriai Manor is a former residential manor in Paežeriai village, Vilkaviškis District Municipality, Lithuania. Currently it is occupied by Suvalkija (Sūduva) Cultural Center of Vilkaviškis District.

References

Manor houses in Lithuania
Classicism architecture in Lithuania